The 1985–86 NBA season was the Nuggets' 10th season in the NBA and 19th season as a franchise.

In the playoffs, the Nuggets defeated the Portland Trail Blazers in four games in the First Round before losing to the eventual Western Conference Champion Houston Rockets in six games in the Semi-finals.

Draft picks

Roster

Regular season

Season standings

z – clinched division title
y – clinched division title
x – clinched playoff spot

Record vs. opponents

Game log

Regular season

|- align="center" bgcolor="#ccffcc"
| 1
| October 25, 1985
| @ Golden State
| W 122–114
|
|
|
| Oakland–Alameda County Coliseum Arena
| 1–0
|- align="center" bgcolor="#ccffcc"
| 2
| October 26, 1985
| Sacramento
| W 123–112
|
|
|
| McNichols Sports Arena
| 2–0
|- align="center" bgcolor="#ccffcc"
| 3
| October 29, 1985
| @ Phoenix
| W 142–127
|
|
|
| Arizona Veterans Memorial Coliseum
| 3–0
|- align="center" bgcolor="#ccffcc"
| 4
| October 31, 1985
| Seattle
| W 90–73
|
|
|
| McNichols Sports Arena
| 4–0

|- align="center" bgcolor="#ccffcc"
| 5
| November 5, 19857:30p.m. MST
| Atlanta
| W 128–113
| English (33)
| Schayes (8)
| English, Hanzlik, Lever (6)
| McNichols Sports Arena8,691
| 5–0
|- align="center" bgcolor="#ccffcc"
| 6
| November 7, 1985
| Dallas
| W 131–99
|
|
|
| McNichols Sports Arena
| 6–0
|- align="center" bgcolor="#ffcccc"
| 7
| November 8, 1985
| @ L.A. Lakers
| L 99–128
|
|
|
| The Forum
| 6–1
|- align="center" bgcolor="#ffcccc"
| 8
| November 12, 1985
| @ Houston
| L 119–127
|
|
|
| The Summit
| 6–2
|- align="center" bgcolor="#ccffcc"
| 9
| November 14, 1985
| San Antonio
| W 112–109
|
|
|
| McNichols Sports Arena
| 7–2
|- align="center" bgcolor="#ccffcc"
| 10
| November 16, 1985
| L.A. Clippers
| W 113–109
|
|
|
| McNichols Sports Arena
| 8–2
|- align="center" bgcolor="#ccffcc"
| 11
| November 19, 1985
| Houston
| W 127–113
|
|
|
| McNichols Sports Arena
| 9–2
|- align="center" bgcolor="#ccffcc"
| 12
| November 21, 1985
| L.A. Lakers
| W 121–120
|
|
|
| McNichols Sports Arena
| 10–2
|- align="center" bgcolor="#ccffcc"
| 13
| November 23, 1985
| Sacramento
| W 122–118
|
|
|
| McNichols Sports Arena
| 11–2
|- align="center" bgcolor="#ffcccc"
| 14
| November 24, 1985
| @ Seattle
| L 84–110
|
|
|
| Seattle Center Coliseum
| 11–3
|- align="center" bgcolor="#ffcccc"
| 15
| November 26, 1985
| Chicago
| L 123–128
|
|
|
| McNichols Sports Arena
| 11–4
|- align="center" bgcolor="#ffcccc"
| 16
| November 27, 1985
| @ Golden State
| L 102–104
|
|
|
| Oakland-Alameda County Coliseum Arena
| 11–5
|- align="center" bgcolor="#ccffcc"
| 17
| November 29, 1985
| @ Utah
| W 129–114
|
|
|
| Salt Palace Acord Arena
| 12–5
|- align="center" bgcolor="#ffcccc"
| 18
| November 30, 1985
| Seattle
| L 123–131 (2OT)
|
|
|
| McNichols Sports Arena
| 12–6

|- align="center" bgcolor="#ffcccc"
| 19
| December 3, 1985
| @ New York
| L 94–111
|
|
|
| Madison Square Garden
| 12–7
|- align="center" bgcolor="#ccffcc"
| 20
| December 4, 1985
| @ Indiana
| W 119–105
|
|
|
| Market Square Arena
| 13–7
|- align="center" bgcolor="#ccffcc"
| 21
| December 6, 1985
| @ Philadelphia
| W 123–121
|
|
|
| The Spectrum
| 14–7
|- align="center" bgcolor="#ffcccc"
| 22
| December 7, 1985
| @ Cleveland
| L 114–124
|
|
|
| Richfield Coliseum
| 14–8
|- align="center" bgcolor="#ccffcc"
| 23
| December 11, 1985
| L.A. Clippers
| W 134–95
|
|
|
| McNichols Sports Arena
| 15–8
|- align="center" bgcolor="#ccffcc"
| 24
| December 13, 1985
| L.A. Lakers
| W 124–120
|
|
|
| McNichols Sports Arena
| 16–8
|- align="center" bgcolor="#ffcccc"
| 25
| December 14, 1985
| @ Dallas
| L 100–127
|
|
|
| Reunion Arena
| 16–9
|- align="center" bgcolor="#ccffcc"
| 26
| December 17, 1985
| Golden State
| W 122–114
|
|
|
| McNichols Sports Arena
| 17–9
|- align="center" bgcolor="#ccffcc"
| 27
| December 19, 1985
| Portland
| W 123–118
|
|
|
| McNichols Sports Arena
| 18–9
|- align="center" bgcolor="#ffcccc"
| 28
| December 21, 1985
| San Antonio
| L 118–128
|
|
|
| McNichols Sports Arena
| 18–10
|- align="center" bgcolor="#ffcccc"
| 29
| December 22, 1985
| @ Portland
| L 114–121
|
|
|
| Memorial Coliseum
| 18–11
|- align="center" bgcolor="#ffcccc"
| 30
| December 28, 1985
| @ San Antonio
| L 112–116
|
|
|
| HemisFair Arena
| 18–12
|- align="center" bgcolor="#ccffcc"
| 31
| December 30, 1985
| Houston
| W 125–122
|
|
|
| McNichols Sports Arena
| 19–12

|- align="center" bgcolor="#ffcccc"
| 32
| January 3, 1986
| @ Seattle
| L 107–117
|
|
|
| Seattle Center Coliseum
| 19–13
|- align="center" bgcolor="#ffcccc"
| 33
| January 4, 1986
| @ Sacramento
| L 107–112
|
|
|
| ARCO Arena
| 19–14
|- align="center" bgcolor="#ccffcc"
| 34
| January 7, 1986
| Dallas
| W 132–110
|
|
|
| McNichols Sports Arena
| 20–14
|- align="center" bgcolor="#ccffcc"
| 35
| January 9, 1986
| Seattle
| W 94–90
|
|
|
| McNichols Sports Arena
| 21–14
|- align="center" bgcolor="#ccffcc"
| 36
| January 11, 1986
| Utah
| W 114–106
|
|
|
| McNichols Sports Arena
| 22–14
|- align="center" bgcolor="#ccffcc"
| 37
| January 13, 1986
| @ Milwaukee
| W 119–115
|
|
|
| MECCA Arena
| 23–14
|- align="center" bgcolor="#ffcccc"
| 38
| January 15, 1986
| @ Boston
| L 100–123
|
|
|
| Boston Garden
| 23–15
|- align="center" bgcolor="#ffcccc"
| 39
| January 17, 1986
| @ Detroit
| L 113–129
|
|
|
| Pontiac Silverdome
| 23–16
|- align="center" bgcolor="#ffcccc"
| 40
| January 18, 1986
| @ New Jersey
| L 113–124
|
|
|
| Brendan Byrne Arena
| 23–17
|- align="center" bgcolor="#ffcccc"
| 41
| January 21, 1986
| @ Utah
| L 114–117 (OT)
|
|
|
| Salt Palace Acord Arena
| 23–18
|- align="center" bgcolor="#ccffcc"
| 42
| January 22, 1986
| New Jersey
| W 137–124
|
|
|
| McNichols Sports Arena
| 23–19
|- align="center" bgcolor="#ffcccc"
| 43
| January 24, 1986
| San Antonio
| L 98–113
|
|
|
| McNichols Sports Arena
| 24–19
|- align="center" bgcolor="#ccffcc"
| 44
| January 25, 1986
| @ L.A. Lakers
| W 127–115
|
|
|
| The Forum
| 25–19
|- align="center" bgcolor="#ccffcc"
| 45
| January 27, 1986
| Cleveland
| W 124–103
|
|
|
| McNichols Sports Arena
| 26–19
|- align="center" bgcolor="#ffcccc"
| 46
| January 28, 1986
| @ Sacramento
| L 120–125
|
|
|
| ARCO Arena
| 26–20
|- align="center" bgcolor="#ccffcc"
| 47
| January 30, 1986
| New York
| W 102–97
|
|
|
| McNichols Sports Arena
| 27–20

|- align="center" bgcolor="#ccffcc"
| 48
| February 1, 1986
| Milwaukee
| W 116–113
|
|
|
| McNichols Sports Arena
| 28–20
|- align="center" bgcolor="#ffcccc"
| 49
| February 3, 1986
| @ Houston
| L 102–104
|
|
|
| The Summit
| 28–21
|- align="center" bgcolor="#ccffcc"
| 50
| February 4, 1986
| Portland
| W 119–118
|
|
|
| McNichols Sports Arena
| 29–21
|- align="center" bgcolor="#ccffcc"
| 51
| February 6, 1986
| @ San Antonio
| W 100–95
|
|
|
| HemisFair Arena
| 30–21
|- align="center"
|colspan="9" bgcolor="#bbcaff"|All-Star Break
|- style="background:#cfc;"
|- bgcolor="#bbffbb"
|- align="center" bgcolor="#ffcccc"
| 52
| February 12, 1986
| @ Dallas
| L 110–117
|
|
|
| Reunion Arena
| 30–22
|- align="center" bgcolor="#ffcccc"
| 53
| February 14, 1986
| @ Phoenix
| L 95–112
|
|
|
| Arizona Veterans Memorial Coliseum
| 30–23
|- align="center" bgcolor="#ccffcc"
| 54
| February 15, 1986
| Golden State
| W 113–100
|
|
|
| McNichols Sports Arena
| 31–23
|- align="center" bgcolor="#ccffcc"
| 55
| February 18, 1986
| Washington
| W 101–90
|
|
|
| McNichols Sports Arena
| 32–23
|- align="center" bgcolor="#ccffcc"
| 56
| February 20, 1986
| Boston
| W 102–100
|
|
|
| McNichols Sports Arena
| 33–23
|- align="center" bgcolor="#ccffcc"
| 57
| February 22, 1986
| Dallas
| W 113–106
|
|
|
| McNichols Sports Arena
| 34–23
|- align="center" bgcolor="#ccffcc"
| 58
| February 24, 1986
| @ Portland
| W 119–113
|
|
|
| Memorial Coliseum
| 35–23
|- align="center" bgcolor="#ccffcc"
| 59
| February 25, 1986
| Phoenix
| W 112–99
|
|
|
| McNichols Sports Arena
| 36–23
|- align="center" bgcolor="#ffcccc"
| 60
| February 27, 1986
| @ Houston
| L 111–117
|
|
|
| The Summit
| 36–24

|- align="center" bgcolor="#ffcccc"
| 61
| March 1, 1986
| Philadelphia
| L 107–118
|
|
|
| McNichols Sports Arena
| 36–25
|- align="center" bgcolor="#ccffcc"
| 62
| March 4, 1986
| Houston
| W 128–115
|
|
|
| McNichols Sports Arena
| 37–25
|- align="center" bgcolor="#ccffcc"
| 63
| March 7, 1986
| Indiana
| W 134–117
|
|
|
| McNichols Sports Arena
| 38–25
|- align="center" bgcolor="#ccffcc"
| 64
| March 9, 1986
| @ L.A. Clippers
| W 123–121
|
|
|
| Los Angeles Memorial Sports Arena
| 39–25
|- align="center" bgcolor="#ffcccc"
| 65
| March 11, 19865:30p.m. MST
| @ Atlanta
| L 116–128
| English (38)
| English (9)
| Evans (5)
| The Omni8,905
| 39–26
|- align="center" bgcolor="#ffcccc"
| 66
| March 13, 1986
| @ Chicago
| L 102–112
|
|
|
| Chicago Stadium
| 39–27
|- align="center" bgcolor="#ccffcc"
| 67
| March 14, 1986
| @ Washington
| W 101–91
|
|
|
| Capital Centre
| 40–27
|- align="center" bgcolor="#ccffcc"
| 68
| March 16, 1986
| Sacramento
| W 119–113
|
|
|
| McNichols Sports Arena
| 41–27
|- align="center" bgcolor="#ffcccc"
| 69
| March 18, 1986
| @ Sacramento
| L 113–117
|
|
|
| ARCO Arena
| 41–28
|- align="center" bgcolor="#ccffcc"
| 70
| March 19, 1986
| Detroit
| W 114–98
|
|
|
| McNichols Sports Arena
| 42–28
|- align="center" bgcolor="#ccffcc"
| 71
| March 21, 1986
| L.A. Clippers
| W 115–104
|
|
|
| McNichols Sports Arena
| 43–28
|- align="center" bgcolor="#ffcccc"
| 72
| March 23, 1986
| @ Golden State
| L 111–113
|
|
|
| Oakland-Alameda County Coliseum Arena
| 43–29
|- align="center" bgcolor="#ffcccc"
| 73
| March 25, 1986
| L.A. Lakers
| L 115–121
|
|
|
| McNichols Sports Arena
| 43–30
|- align="center" bgcolor="#ffcccc"
| 74
| March 26, 1986
| @ Utah
| L 101–116
|
|
|
| Salt Palace Acord Arena
| 43–31
|- align="center" bgcolor="#ccffcc"
| 75
| March 28, 1986
| Utah
| W 128–120
|
|
|
| McNichols Sports Arena
| 44–31

|- align="center" bgcolor="#ffcccc"
| 76
| April 1, 1986
| @ Portland
| L 110–127
|
|
|
| Memorial Coliseum
| 44–32
|- align="center" bgcolor="#ffcccc"
| 77
| April 3, 1986
| @ Dallas
| L 114–115
|
|
|
| Reunion Arena
| 44–33
|- align="center" bgcolor="#ccffcc"
| 78
| April 6, 1986
| @ San Antonio
| W 124–106
|
|
|
| HemisFair Arena
| 45–33
|- align="center" bgcolor="#ccffcc"
| 79
| April 7, 1986
| @ Phoenix
| W 131–123
|
|
|
| Arizona Veterans Memorial Coliseum
| 46–33
|- align="center" bgcolor="#ffcccc"
| 80
| April 9, 1986
| @ L.A. Clippers
| L 127–132
|
|
|
| Los Angeles Memorial Sports Arena
| 46–34
|- align="center" bgcolor="#ccffcc"
| 81
| April 10, 1986
| Phoenix
| W 115–113
|
|
|
| McNichols Sports Arena
| 47–34
|- align="center" bgcolor="#ffcccc"
| 82
| April 12, 1986
| Utah
| L 99–117
|
|
|
| McNichols Sports Arena
| 47–35

Playoffs

|-
|- align="center" bgcolor="#ccffcc"
| 1
| April 18, 1986
| Portland
| W 133–126
| Calvin Natt (40)
| Danny Schayes (11)
| English, Lever (9)
| McNichols Sports Arena13,209
| 1–0
|- align="center" bgcolor="#ffcccc"
| 2
| April 20, 1986
| Portland
| L 106–108
| Alex English (24)
| Blair Rasmussen (9)
| Alex English (10)
| McNichols Sports Arena11,724
| 1–1
|- align="center" bgcolor="#ccffcc"
| 3
| April 22, 1986
| @ Portland
| W 115–104
| Blair Rasmussen (15)
| Calvin Natt (11)
| Fat Lever (5)
| Memorial Coliseum12,666
| 2–1
|- align="center" bgcolor="#ccffcc"
| 4
| April 24, 1986
| @ Portland
| W 116–112
| Fat Lever (30)
| T. R. Dunn (11)
| Alex English (8)
| Memorial Coliseum12,666
| 3–1
|-

|-
|- align="center" bgcolor="#ffcccc"
| 1
| April 26, 1986
| @ Houston
| L 119–126
| Alex English (34)
| Schayes, Natt (7)
| English, Lever (9)
| The Summit15,448
| 0–1
|- align="center" bgcolor="#ffcccc"
| 2
| April 29, 1986
| @ Houston
| L 101–119
| Blair Rasmussen (18)
| Wayne Cooper (9)
| Mike Evans (7)
| The Summit16,016
| 0–2
|- align="center" bgcolor="#ccffcc"
| 3
| May 2, 1986
| Houston
| W 116–115
| Alex English (33)
| Danny Schayes (8)
| Alex English (5)
| McNichols Sports Arena17,022
| 1–2
|- align="center" bgcolor="#ccffcc"
| 4
| May 4, 1986
| Houston
| W 114–111 (OT)
| Alex English (28)
| Wayne Cooper (9)
| Turner, Hanzlik (5)
| McNichols Sports Arena14,152
| 2–2
|- align="center" bgcolor="#ffcccc"
| 5
| May 6, 1986
| @ Houston
| L 103–131
| Alex English (27)
| Blair Rasmussen (12)
| Fat Lever (4)
| The Summit16,016
| 2–3
|- align="center" bgcolor="#ffcccc"
| 6
| May 8, 1986
| Houston
| L 122–126 (2OT)
| Alex English (42)
| Danny Schayes (14)
| Fat Lever (7)
| McNichols Sports Arena17,022
| 2–4
|-

Player statistics

Season

Playoffs

Awards and records
 Alex English, All-NBA Second Team
 Bill Hanzlik, NBA All-Defensive Second Team

Transactions

References

See also
 1985–86 NBA season

Denver Nuggets seasons
Den
Denver Nugget
Denver Nugget